Garden State may refer to:

Official state nicknames
 New Jersey, United States
 Victoria (Australia)

Arts and entertainment
 Garden State (film), a 2004 film by Zach Braff
Garden State (soundtrack), the film's soundtrack
 Garden State (novel), a 1991 novel by Rick Moody
 The Garden State, a 1988 short story collection by Gary Krist
 "Garden State", a trance music track which was produced by Airbase
 "Garden State", a post-hardcore music track by Senses Fail

Other uses
 Garden State Parkway, a toll road in New Jersey
 Garden State Discovery Museum, a children's museum in Cherry Hill, New Jersey
 Garden State Life Insurance Company, which was founded in New Jersey but is now headquartered in League City, Texas
 Garden State Plaza, a shopping mall in Paramus, New Jersey